Pristidactylus valeriae is a species of lizard in the family Leiosauridae. The species is endemic to Chile and particularly to the Chilean matorral.

Etymology
The specific name, valeriae, is in honor of Donoso-Barros' fourth daughter, Valeria.

Habitat

Reproduction
P. valeriae is oviparous.

Sources
Hogan, C. Michael, & World Wildlife Fund (2013). Chilean matorral. ed. M.McGinley. Encyclopedia of Earth. National Council for Science and the Environment. Washington, District of Columbia.

References

Further reading
Castro-Pastene C, Salazar A (2016). "Registro de actividad nocturna del Gruñidor de Valeria, Pristidactylus valeriae (Donoso-Barros 1966) (Squamata: Leiosauridae), en el cerro Poqui, Coltauco, Región de O'Higgins, Chile". Boletín Chileno de Herpetología 3: 33. (in Spanish).
Donoso-Barros R (1966). Reptiles de Chile. Santiago, Chile: Ediciones de la Universidad de Chile. 458 pp. (Urostrophus valeriae, new species, p. 369). (in Spanish).
Etheridge R, Williams EE (1985). "Notes on Pristidactylus (Squamata: Iguanidae)". Breviora (483): 1–18. (Pristidactylus valeriae, new combination, pp. 13–14).

Pristidactylus
Endemic fauna of Chile
Lizards of South America
Reptiles of Chile
Chilean Matorral
Reptiles described in 1966
Taxa named by Roberto Donoso-Barros
Taxonomy articles created by Polbot